The Seram crow (Euploea dentiplaga) is a species of nymphalid butterfly in the Danainae subfamily. It is endemic to Indonesia.

References

Euploea
Butterflies of Indonesia
Butterflies described in 1915
Endemic fauna of Seram Island
Taxonomy articles created by Polbot
Taxa named by Walter Rothschild